Jill S. Levenson is an American social worker and professor of social work at Barry University, known for her research into prevention of sexual violence. She studies and treats both victimization and perpetration as well as policies related to management of people convicted of sexual crimes 
She has been a co-investigator or consultant on five grants funded by the U.S. Department of Justice, researching the impact and effectiveness of social policies and therapeutic interventions designed to reduce sexual violence. Her ground-breaking research has focused on the prevalence and impact of adverse childhood experiences and their relationship to adult psychosocial problems and criminality. She has published over 120 peer-reviewed articles and book chapters, many of which have been about adverse childhood experiences and the implications for trauma-informed care.

She is frequently invited to present at various state, local, and national conferences, and across the globe, as a keynote speaker about trauma-informed care in clinical, correctional, and forensic settings.

Education and career
Levenson received her BA in sociology from the University of Pittsburgh in 1985, her MSW in clinical social work from the University of Maryland, Baltimore in 1987, and her PhD in social welfare from Florida International University in 2003. In 2004, she joined the faculty of Lynn University's College of Arts and Sciences, where she remained until joining Barry in 2014.

Views
Levenson has criticized sex offender registries for what she claims is their ineffectiveness, telling NPR in 2015 that "The consensus of that [policy] research does not point in the direction of registries reducing sexual crimes or sexual recidivism." She has expressed similar views about laws restricting where sex offenders can legally live, acknowledging that these laws are well-intended but saying that "they don't really address the most common types of situations children are abused in," because "Children are much more likely to be sexually abused by someone they know and trust." She has also been critical of the use of GPSs to monitor sex offenders, because, according to her, the technology is used too sweepingly and its capabilities are overestimated. She advocates for evidence-based policies and interventions that prevent sexual violence and recidivism, and that also promote successful re-entry, reintegration, and rehabilitation.

References

External links
Faculty page
Profile at Google Scholar

Living people
American social workers
Barry University faculty
University of Pittsburgh alumni
University of Maryland, Baltimore alumni
Florida International University alumni
Year of birth missing (living people)